PurVIEW is an integrated image display and viewing plug-in software package that incorporates stereoscopic viewing technology for ESRI ArcGIS 9 (or later version). Essentially, PurVIEW is a photogrammetry-based data capture workstation that extend the ArcGIS environment. It converts Arc- desktops into precise stereo-viewing windows for geo-referenced aerial or space-borne imagery. Digitizing features directly yields positional accuracy comparable with photogrammetric mapping.

Using ArcMap, geodatabase contents can be directly accessed and reviewed superimposed on standard geo-referenced 3-dimensional image models, revealing errors and omissions, or natural changes. 

PurVIEW's creators, International Systemap, are working with ESRI to develop seamless software integration for the 2010 release of ArcGIS 9.4. 

PurVIEW is suitable for a number of professional fields, such as mapping, geomatics, geology, forestry and mining.

External links
http://www.purview.com/
http://www.mypurview.com/
https://web.archive.org/web/20091016095055/http://www.esricanada.com/EN_products/7098.asp

Image processing software
GIS software